Newton—North Delta was a federal electoral district in the province of British Columbia, Canada, that had been represented in the House of Commons of Canada from 2004 to 2015, when it was abolished and redistributed to the Delta and Surrey—Newton electoral districts.

Geography
It is located within the Greater Vancouver Regional District, and consists of the eastern part of the Corporation of Delta and the western and central parts of the City of Surrey.

Demographics
Newton—North Delta has the highest percentage of people of Sikh ethnic origin (27.6%); of native Punjabi speakers (33.4%); of those that use Punjabi as home language (26.8%); as well as of South Asians overall (42.7%), lagging only Richmond - 50.2% Chinese - in terms of population proportion of a single visible minority group.

In terms of religion, it is the federal riding with the highest percentage of Sikhs (27.6%) and, more generally, the highest percentage of people with a non-Judeo-Christian religion affiliation, 38.0% in particular (Sikh: 27.6%, Muslim: 4.3%, Hindu: 4.1%, etc.).

History
The electoral district was created in 2003 from parts of Delta—South Richmond  and Surrey Central ridings.

Members of Parliament
The riding has elected the following Members of Parliament:

During the 40th Parliament, Dhaliwal was a member of the Standing Committee on Transport, Infrastructure and Communities.

Election results

See also
 List of Canadian federal electoral districts
 Past Canadian electoral districts

References

Notes

External links
 Library of Parliament Riding Profile
 Expenditures - 2004
 Website of the Parliament of Canada
 Map of Newton—North Delta riding archived by Elections Canada

Former federal electoral districts of British Columbia
Federal electoral districts in Greater Vancouver and the Fraser Valley
Politics of Delta, British Columbia
Politics of Surrey, British Columbia